Siebe may refer to:
Augustus Siebe: inventor of the standard diving dress
Siebe Gorman Ltd: a company founded by Augustus Siebe and his son-on-law Gorman making diving helmets
Siebe plc: a large engineering group
 Siebe Suit, or standard diving dress